In music, Op. 15 stands for Opus number 15. Compositions that are assigned this number include:

 Alkan – Trois morceaux dans le genre pathétique
 Bartók – Five Songs, Op. 15
 Beethoven - Piano Concerto No. 1
 Brahms – Piano Concerto No. 1
 Britten – Violin Concerto
 Chopin – Nocturnes, Op. 15
 Dvořák – Ballade
 Elgar – Chanson de Nuit
 Fauré – Piano Quartet No. 1
 Gál – Die heilige Ente
 Gottschalk – The Banjo
 Myaskovsky – Symphony No. 3
 Petit – Grande symphonie funèbre et triomphale
 Saint-Saëns – Serenade in E-flat major
 Schoenberg – The Book of the Hanging Gardens
 Schubert – Wanderer Fantasy
 Schumann – Kinderszenen
 Shostakovich – The Nose
 Sibelius – The Wood Nymph
 Somov – Winternacht
 Strauss – Sträußchen
 Szymanowski – Symphony No. 1
 Weill – Der Protagonist